The 5000 metres at the 2005 World Championships in Athletics was held on August 11 and August 14 at the Helsinki Olympic Stadium.

Medalists

Heats
August 11, 2005

Heat 1
  Isaac Kiprono Songok, Kenya 13:20.36 Q
  Tariku Bekele, Ethiopia 13:20.66 Q
  John Kibowen, Kenya 13:21.08 Q
  Dejene Berhanu, Ethiopia 13:21.20 Q
  James Kwalia C'Kurui, Qatar 13:21.36 q
  Zersenay Tadese, Eritrea 13:22.36 q
  Boniface Kiprop Toroitich, Uganda 13:22.44 q
  Wilson Busienei, Uganda 13:25.36 (SB)
  Alberto García, Spain 13:25.44
  Ian Dobson, United States 13:27.16
  Hicham Bellani, Morocco 13:29.44
  Alejandro Suárez, Mexico 13:31.63 (SB)
  Serhiy Lebid, Ukraine 13:43.50
  Reid Coolsaet, Canada 13:53.15
  Roberto García, Spain 13:59.50
  Ryan Hall, United States 13:59.86
  Eduardo Buenavista, Philippines 14:24.90
  Michael Sanchez, Gibraltar 15:34.82
  Mohammed Mostafa, Palestine 15:37.04

Heat 2
  Eliud Kipchoge, Kenya 13:12.86 Q
  Craig Mottram, Australia 13:12.93 Q
  Sileshi Sihine, Ethiopia 13:13.04 Q (SB)
  Ali Saïdi-Sief, Algeria 13:13.50 Q (SB)
  Benjamin Limo, Kenya 13:14.30 q
  Fabiano Joseph Naasi, Tanzania 13:18.18 q (SB)
  Moukheld Al-Outaibi, Saudi Arabia 13:20.06 q
  Marius Bakken, Norway 13:22.00 q
  Mohammed Mourhit, Belgium 13:22.87
  Samson Kiflemariam, Eritrea 13:31.05 (SB)
  Essa Ismail Rashed, Qatar 13:31.73
  Moses Kipsiro, Uganda  13:32.25
  Tim Broe, United States 13:51.17
  Thiha Aung, Myanmar 14:33.69 (PB)
  Francis Khanje, Malawi 14:51.49 (PB)
  Jesús España, Spain DQ
  Mohammed Amyn, Morocco DNF
  Abderrahim Goumri, Morocco DNF
  Günther Weidlinger, Austria DNF

Final
August 14, 2005

  Benjamin Limo, Kenya 13:32.55
  Sileshi Sihine, Ethiopia 13:32.81
  Craig Mottram, Australia 13:32.96
  Eliud Kipchoge, Kenya 13:33.04
  Ali Saïdi-Sief, Algeria 13:33.25
  John Kibowen, Kenya 13:33.77
  Tariku Bekele, Ethiopia 13:34.76
  Dejene Berhanu, Ethiopia 13:34.98
  Moukheld Al-Outaibi, Saudi Arabia 13:35.29
  Isaac Kiprono Songok, Kenya 13:37.10
  Boniface Kiprop Toroitich, Uganda 13:37.73
  Marius Bakken, Norway 13:38.63
  James Kwalia C'Kurui, Qatar 13:38.90
  Zersenay Tadese, Eritrea 13:40.27
  Fabiano Joseph Naasi, Tanzania 13:42.50

External links
World Athletics results (heats)
World Athletics results (final)

50 km walk
5000 metres at the World Athletics Championships